Ljubavi may refer to:

 Ljubavi (album), 2009 album by Serbian singer and songwriter Željko Joksimović
 Ljubavi (Idoli song)", 1985 song by Serbian band Idoli
 Ljubavi (Željko Joksimović song), 2009 single from the eponymous album by Željko Joksimović

See also
 Ljubav (singular)